Leaf from a Manichaean book MIK III 8259 is a fragment of Manichaean manuscripts collected in Germany Berlin Asian Art Museum, drawn during the 8th-9th centuries. It was discovered in Xinjiang by German Turpan expedition team in the early 20th century. It is the largest currently known manuscript fragment. In the bottom segment three laymen and three laywomen of the Uyghur royal family are listening to a sermon, while in the upper section elects are giving a sermon. It is the largest codex fragment with a figural scene, having a large portion of text on the same fragment, on the reverse of the image there is text.

References 

Manichaean art
Chinese manuscripts
Illuminated manuscripts